María Esperanza Bofill Ferrer (30 March 1888 – 7 November 1962), better known by her stage name Esperanza Iris, was a Mexican singer, leading lady, and stage actress.

Early life 

Born in Villahermosa, Tabasco, 30 March 1888, her birth name was María Esperanza Bofill Ferrer, but her stage name was Esperanza Iris.

She began her artistic career in the theater company Austri and Palacios in the play Les cloches de Corneville, which lasted for five years. Then in 1902 in the Teatro Principal she participated in Curti's , for which she won the respect of the public. In Brazil she was named "the Queen of Operetta" and "Empress of Grace," and in Spain she was decorated by King Alfonso XIII. Iris went on an international tour to Cuba between 1910 and 1911 with the play The Merry Widow.

Theater 
In 1918 she constructed her own theater, the Gran Teatro Esperanza Iris, designed by architect . It was inaugurated in the presence of President Venustiano Carranza. She organized a choir in the Lecumberri Penitentiary when her husband Paco Sierra was a prisoner after an incident in 1952.

Her last theater performance was in the play The Merry Widow. Iris died on November 7, 1962, in Mexico City. Her remains were interred in the Panteón Jardín.

Homage 
To pay homage to her artistic career in Mexico, the state theater of Tabasco was rechristened Teatro Esperanza Iris. Mexico City's Historical Center was named a World Heritage Site in 1987 by the United Nation's Educational, Scientific, and Cultural Organization (UNESCO).

See also 
 Villahermosa

References 

1888 births
1962 deaths
People from Villahermosa
Mexican stage actresses
Singers from Tabasco
Actresses from Tabasco
20th-century Mexican actresses
20th-century Mexican women singers